Rivoli may refer to:

Places
Rivoli, Piedmont, a comune in Turin, Italy
Rivoli Veronese, a comune in the province of Verona, Italy
Rivoli Bay, a bay in South Australia
Rivoli Township, Mercer County, Illinois, US
Rue de Rivoli, a street in Paris

Structures
Rivoli (Turin Metro), a railway station in Rivoli, Piedmont
The Rivoli, a restaurant/club in Toronto, Ontario, Canada
The Rivoli Ballroom, a dance venue in South London, UK
Rivoli Cinemas, a multiplex cinema in Melbourne, Australia
Rivoli Theatre (disambiguation), several theaters

Other uses
Rivoli (surname)
Rivoli United F.C., a Jamaican football club
Battle of Rivoli, a 1797 battle near Rivoli Veronese
SS Rivoli, originally Empire Bute, a coaster in service with A Scotto Pugliese Fils & Compagnie, Algeria, 1948–1952